Dorathy Farr (1910  - August 21, 1989) was an American artist.

Farr was born in St. Louis, Missouri in 1910.

She attended The New School.
Farr and her husband, Fred Farr (1914-1973), painted 24 murals at the Wilbur J. Cohen Federal Building in Washington, D.C. as part of the Works Progress Administration.

Notable collections
24 murals at the Wilbur J. Cohen Federal Building, 1942, casein and oil on linoleum, Smithsonian American Art Museum, Washington, D.C.

References

1910 births
1989 deaths
20th-century American women artists
Works Progress Administration workers
The New School alumni
Artists from St. Louis
American women painters
20th-century American painters
Federal Art Project artists